Virbia affinis is a moth in the family Erebidae first described by Walter Rothschild in 1910. It is found in Ecuador and Colombia.

References

affinis
Moths described in 1910